Teochew woodcarving, or Chaozhou woodcarving (Chinese: 潮州木雕; pinyin: Cháozhōumùdiāo), is a form of Chinese wood carving originating from the Tang Dynasty. It is very popular in Chaoshan, a region in the east of Guangdong. The Teochew people used a great deal of Teochew wood carving in their splendid buildings.

Gallery

See also 
 Cantonese architecture
 Cantonese garden

External links 
Chaozhou woodcarving

Woodcarving
Teochew culture
Cantonese folk art